List of administrative division codes of the PRC in Division 1 or North China.

Beijing (11)

Tianjin (12)

Hebei (13)

Shanxi (14)

Inner Mongolia (15)

China geography-related lists